Croats form a part of the permanent population of Italy. Traditionally, there is an autochthonous community in the Molise region known as the Molise Croats, but there are many other Croats living in or associated with Italy through other means. In 2010, persons with Croatian citizenship in Italy numbered 21,079.

Analysis
Croats of Italy could mean any of the following:
Molise Croats - a long-established Croatian population in the Molise region.
Ethnic Croats to have relocated to Italy from any region to which Croats may be autochthonous (e.g.  Republic of Croatia, Bosnia and Herzegovina and other countries).

Molise Croats

Molise Croats, who were the first Croats to settle in Italy, at the time of the Ottoman expansion in the Balkans, are one of the linguistic minority officially recognised by the Italian Republic. They achieved protection as a minority on 5 November 1996 by an agreement signed between Croatia and Italy. According to 2001 census, there were 2,801 Molise Croats, of which 813 lived in San Felice del Molise, 800 in Acquaviva Collecroce and 468 in Montemitro. The number of Molise Croats is in decline.

Associations, publications and media
In the region of Molise, there is the Federation of Croatian-Molise Cultural Associations which unifies the Association "Luigi Zara", the Foundation "Agostina Piccoli", the Association "Naš život" and the Association "Naš grad". The main association of all Croats of Italy is the Alliance of Croatian Associations as founded in 2001; this association consists of: the Croatian-Italian Association of Rome, the Croatian Union of Milano, the Croatian Union of Trieste, the Croatian Union of Venetia, the Croatian-Italian Association of Udine and the Association "Luigi Zara". Also, the Club of Friends of Croatia is active in Milano.
A Croatian organization that has a longer history in Italy is the Pontifical Croatian College of St. Jerome, a Catholic college. Known as the Collegium Hieronymianum Illyricorum (Illyrian Hieronymian College; San Girolamo degli Illirici in Italian) since 1902, the college served Croatian Catholics, before being renamed Pontificium Collegium Chroaticum Sancti Hieronymi (Pontifical Croatian College of St. Jerome) in 1971. Another Croatian Catholic organizations in Italy is the Domus Croata "Dr. Ivan Merz", an organization of Croatian pilgrims.

The Foundation "Agostina Piccoli" and the Association "Naš život" are issuing the bilingual magazine "Riča živa/Parola viva", while the Alliance of Croatian Associations prints also the bilingual magazine "Insieme".

Famous Croats of Italy and Italians with Croatian ancestry
 Lidia Bastianich, celebrity chef, television host, author, and restaurateur.
 Saša Bjelanović, Croatian footballer
 Antonio Blasevich, footballer and coach
 Michael Bublé, Canadian singer and record producer whose ancestors were Croats from Italy
 Giulio Clovio, Croatian painter
 Matthaeus Ferchius, Italian-Croatian theologian
 Gino Gardassanich, American footballer
 William Klinger, late Italian historian 
 Giovanni Martinolich, late Italian chess master 
 Denis Majstorovic, Italian rugby player 
 Predrag Matvejević, Croatian writer
 Nina Morić, model
 Nikola Radulović, Italian basketball player
 Max Romih, late Italian chess master 
 Antonio Smareglia, late Italian opera composer born in Pula to an Italian father and a Croatian mother 
 Uros Vico, Italian tennis player
 Antonio Vojak, Italian footballer
 Oliviero Vojak, Italian footballer

See also 
 Croatia–Italy relations
 Croats
 List of Croats

References

Italy
Ethnic groups in Italy